Robert Brown (Robby) Gardner (February 27, 1939 – May 5, 1998) was an American mathematician who worked on differential geometry, a field in which he obtained several novel results. He was the author and co-author of three influential books, produced more than fifty papers, eighteen masters students and thirteen Ph.D students. His 1991 book, Exterior Differential Systems, coauthored with R. Bryant,  S. S. Chern, H. Goldschmidt, and P. Griffiths, is the standard reference for the subject. Robert Bryant, Duke University's Professor of Mathematics and the president of the American Mathematical Society (2015-2017) was a student of his.

He is better known in the United States for his improvements and popularization of the methods of Élie Cartan (most notably, Cartan's equivalence method, an algorithmic procedure for determining if two geometric shapes are different). The works of Cartan were hard to grasp for most students, and Gardner worked to explain them in more accessible ways.

Biography
He was born on February 27, 1939. Gardner graduated from Princeton University in 1959, earned a master's degree from Columbia University in 1960, and completed his PhD in 1965 from the University of California, Berkeley, under the orientation of Shiing-Shen Chern. After this, he worked at many places, including becoming a member of the Institute for Advanced Study, and some years as assistant professor at Columbia University. He joined the faculty of the University of North Carolina at Chapel Hill in 1971 and became a full professor there in 1977. He died on May 5, 1998.

Legacy
In his memory, the UNC Mathematics Department created the Robert Brown Gardner Memorial Fund, devoted to supporting graduate student activities.

Selected publications
The Method of Equivalence and Its Applications 
R. Bryant, S.-S. Chern, R. B. Gardner, H. Goldschmidt, P. Griffiths, Exterior Differential Systems, MSRI Publications, Springer, 1990
Lectures on Exterior Algebras Over Commutative Rings
Differential Geometric Methods in Partial Differential Equations

References

Further reading
Pat Eberlein, "Robby Gardner (February 27, 1939 - May 5, 1998)"

1939 births
1998 deaths
20th-century American mathematicians
Geometers
Princeton University alumni
Columbia University alumni
University of California, Berkeley alumni
Columbia University faculty
University of North Carolina at Chapel Hill faculty
Place of birth missing